Andreas Platis was a Hellenic Army officer who reached the rank of Lieutenant General.

Biography 
Born in Athens on 3 November 1865, he enrolled in the Hellenic Military Academy and graduated on 11 August 1888 as an Infantry 2nd Lieutenant. He fought in the Greco-Turkish War of 1897 and was a battalion commander of the 17th Infantry Regiment in the Balkan Wars. A moderate monarchist, he was dismissed from the army by the Venizelists in 1917–1920, but was recommissioned following the Venzelist electoral defeat in November 1920. In 1921 he assumed command of the 7th Infantry Division, which he led in the Greek summer offensive and the advance towards the Sakarya River. In June 1922 he was named CO of the Smyrna Superior General Military Command, covering the Army of Asia Minor's rear areas. Following the Turkish offensive in August and the collapse of the Greek army, he assumed for a short time command of the Greek troops in the Erythraean peninsula, before they were evacuated to Greece. Following the September 1922 Revolution, he went into retirement along with several other pro-monarchist officers in November 1923.

Sources 
 

1865 births
20th-century deaths
20th-century Greek people
Hellenic Army lieutenant generals
Greek military personnel of the Balkan Wars
Greek military personnel of the Greco-Turkish War (1919–1922)
Military personnel from Athens
Recipients of the Cross of Valour (Greece)